Karahacip is a village in the Ortaköy District of Çorum Province in Turkey. Its population is 892 (2021). Before the 2013 reorganisation, it was a town (belde).

References

Villages in Ortaköy District, Çorum